A Garibaldi shirt (also called "Garibaldi jacket" or "Camicia rossa") was a woman's fashion, a red wool shirt named after the Italian patriot Giuseppe Garibaldi first popularized in 1860.  It was the direct ancestor of the modern women's blouse.

Garibaldi's Redshirts
Giuseppe Garibaldi (1807 - 1882) was an Italian folk hero, a nationalist in favor of Italian independence from Austrian domination.   Garibaldi's "total sincerity and honesty, and exceptional physical courage gave him the kind of personal magnetism which made women of all classes love him, and men of all classes follow him in circumstances of acute danger."  During the Expedition of the Thousand campaign in 1860, his volunteer followers were known as "Redshirts" (Camicie Rosse in Italian)  for their uniforms (or rather shirts, as they could not afford full uniforms), and it is these who inspired the fashion.

The Garibaldi shirt
According to a brief history of the shirt waist written in 1902, the fashion for the Garibaldi shirt was initiated by Empress Eugénie of France.  Its first mention is in 1860, and clothing historian says of it: "The Garibaldi jacket, of scarlet cashmere with military trimmings of gold braid, was hailed as 'the gem of the season'."  It was extremely popular during the first half of the 1860s.  Versions in white and lighter fabrics also appeared, and children frequently wore it.

Camicia rossa
"Camicia rossa" or red shirt is a type of clothing. The century illustrated monthly magazine, Volume 74 explains that "One...relic is none other than a veritable camicia rossa, or red shirt, worn by Garibaldi at [a] siege". A Cultural History of the Modern Age: The Crisis of the European Soul says that "For a considerable time Garibaldi was the most famous man in Europe, and the red shirt, la camicia rossa, became the fashion for ladies, even outside Italy"

Italians during the American Civil War
During the American Civil War, the Garibaldi Guard, composed of European immigrants, from New York City, served in the Union Army, wearing the red, Garibaldi shirts, as a part of their battle dress uniforms.

Their Confederate counterpart, the mainly Italian Garibaldi Legion, were also known for wearing red Garibaldi shirts and cocked hats with plumes in the Italian national colors as a part of their uniforms.

Late and post-Victorian women's fashion
The Garibaldi shirt was popularized in 1860 and the baggy, bloused style was worn exclusively by women and remained popular for some years, eventually turning into the Victorian shirt waist modern woman's blouse.

Notes

See also 
 Zouave jacket, another military-inspired fashion of the same era

References

1860s fashion
History of clothing (Western fashion)
Tops (clothing)
Clothing in politics
Giuseppe Garibaldi